Belafonte By Request is an album by Harry Belafonte, released by RCA Records in 1970.

Track listing 
 "Mr. Bojangles" (Jerry Jeff Walker) – 4:47
 "Oh Linda" (Gordon Lightfoot) – 3:14
 "Missouri Birds" (John Stewart) – 3:54
 "Big City Living" – 3:13
 "Abraham, Martin & John" (Dick Holler) – 3:54
 "You'll Still Be Needing Me After I'm Gone" (Gordon Lightfoot) – 3:39
 "Marianne" (William Eaton) – 3:08
 "Scarborough Fair" (Traditional, Paul Simon, Art Garfunkel) – 3:24
 "Put Your Tears Away" (Bobby Scott, Richard Ahlert) – 3:22
 "I've Got a Secret" (Fred Neil) – 3:44

Personnel 
 Harry Belafonte – vocals
 Arranged and conducted by William Eaton
Production notes:
 Jack Pleis – producer
 Andy Wiswell – producer "Put Your Tears Away"
 Paul Goodman – engineer
 Pete Abbott – engineer
 Ken Whitmore – cover, liner notes

References 

1970 albums
Harry Belafonte albums
RCA Records albums
Albums produced by Jack Pleis